Interact may refer to:

 InterAct, a U.S. public safety software company founded in 1975
 interACT, trade name of Advocates for Informed Choice
 Subsidiaries of U.S. software and consulting company Advanced Computer Techniques:
 Inter-ACT
 Inter-Act
 InterACT (Advanced Computer Techniques)
 InterACT Disability Arts Festival, a three-day New Zealand event begun in 2011
 Interact Home Computer, a briefly-extant 1979 U.S. personal computer
 Interact Incorporated, a U.S. telecommunications company founded in 1981
 InterAct Theatre Company, a U.S. organization based in Philadelphia, founded in 1988
 InterAct, a subsidiary of Recoton that owned the GameShark brand for a while
 Rotary Interact, a service club for youths that is part of Rotary International

See also
 
 
 Interac
 Interaction (disambiguation)
 Interactive (disambiguation)